Dudley Campbell (24 December 1833 – 24 January 1900) was an English cricketer. He played six first-class matches for Cambridge University Cricket Club between 1853 and 1854.

See also
 List of Cambridge University Cricket Club players

References

External links
 

1833 births
1900 deaths
English cricketers
Cambridge University cricketers
People from Westminster
Marylebone Cricket Club cricketers